Caligula lindia is a moth of the family Saturniidae. It was described by Frederic Moore in 1865. It is found in south-eastern Afghanistan north to the Salang Pass, and Kashmir. It is also found in the Himalayan foothills of northern India, from Kashmir to Bhutan and southern Tibet, China and Nepal. It is found up to heights of 2,400 meters.

External links
Species info

Caligula (moth)
Moths described in 1865
Moths of Asia
Taxa named by Frederic Moore